The 2004–05 Sussex County Football League season was the 80th in the history of Sussex County Football League a football competition in England.

Division One

Division One featured 17 clubs which competed in the division last season, along with three new clubs, promoted from Division Two:
Eastbourne United Association
Littlehampton Town
Worthing United

League table

Division Two

Division Two featured 14 clubs which competed in the division last season, along with four new clubs.
Clubs relegated from Division One:
Selsey
Shoreham
Clubs promoted from Division Three:
Crowborough Athletic
St Francis Rangers

League table

Division Three

Division Three featured eleven clubs which competed in the division last season, along with two new clubs:
Haywards Heath Town, relegated from Division Two
Rustington, joined from the West Sussex League

League table

References

2004-05
9